Franks is an unincorporated community in Pulaski County, in the U.S. state of Missouri.

History
A post office called Franks was in operation from 1889 until 1954. The community has the name of Frank Stanzel, a local tradesman.

References

Unincorporated communities in Pulaski County, Missouri
Unincorporated communities in Missouri